Jelle Klaasen (born 17 October 1984), nicknamed The Cobra, is a Dutch professional darts player who plays in the Professional Darts Corporation (PDC) and World Darts Federation (WDF) events. In 2006, he became the youngest darts player to win the World Darts Championship, aged 21 at the time. He also is a Dutch Open champion. Since November 2022, he has been the leader of the World Darts Federation men's ranking.

Beginnings of his career
His first attempt at the international stage was a 2005 Winmau World Masters ended with a 2–3 defeat to Irishman Steve McDonald.

On 15 January 2006, Klaasen became the youngest World Darts Champion, aged 21 years 90 days, when he defeated fellow Dutchman Raymond van Barneveld in the final of the 2006 BDO World Championship by 7 sets to 5. He also beat Shaun Greatbatch and world number one Mervyn King on his way to the final. Before the championship, he was said to be a 100–1 outsider to win the title as he did not even have a BDO Ranking.

As World Champion, he was invited to the 2006 World Darts Trophy in his home country, but lost 0–3 to Tony Eccles in the first round. In 2007, he won in the first round 3–1 against reigning PDC World Champion Raymond van Barneveld, shortly after that he lost in the second round to Andy Hamilton. He also played in the 2006 International Darts League and beat 13-times World Champion Phil Taylor 7–6 in his last group match, but it was not enough to qualify for the knockout stages. He beat Andy Fordham and Dick van Dijk but lost to Martin Adams, Shaun Greatbatch and Colin Lloyd in his other group matches.

Klaasen has won some Open events in his native country including the Alkmaar Open. In March 2006 he was runner-up in the Finnish Open, losing in the final to Martin Atkins by 2–6. He also reached the quarter-finals of the Swiss Open and Denmark Open during 2006. In 2006 Winmau World Masters, he was seeded 13 but suffered a straight sets defeat in his first match against fellow Dutchman Mario Robbe.

Klaasen returned to the Lakeside to defend his World title at the 2007 Championship. Klaasen was unseeded for the event after a poor run of form and was facing the seeded Co Stompé, with eventual winner Martin Adams waiting in round two should he win. Klaasen became the sixth defending champion to fall at the first hurdle in his title defence with his first round loss to fellow countryman Stompé by three sets to nil. Although Klaasen was lower in the rankings at the time, it was considered an upset as Stompé had not won at the Lakeside in the previous four years.

The day after the final it was announced that Klaasen would be defecting to the rival Professional Darts Corporation, alongside two fellow countrymen, Michael van Gerwen and Vincent van der Voort. The BDO planned to take legal action as Jelle had a year left on his  contract.

PDC Career

Klaasen did not make an immediate impact on the PDC circuit, having to start virtually from scratch at 262 in the world rankings. He competed at most of the Pro Tour events (Players Championships and UK Open Regional Finals) to improve his ranking. He reached the quarter-finals of two non-televised Pro Tour events before winning a Players Championship – the John McEvoy Gold Dart Classic in November which saw him climb to 49 in the  PDC Order of Merit. He only made it into one televised PDC event in the UK during 2007 (the UK Open where he reached the last 32) but his form towards the end of the year ensured automatic qualification for the 2008 World Championship – his debut in the PDC version. He lost in the first round to fellow Dutchman Vincent van der Voort in a sudden death leg, having missed ten darts to win the match.

He defeated Colin Lloyd, Jan van der Rassel and Andy Hamilton to reach the quarter finals of the 2009 PDC World Championship, only dropping one set in the process. In the quarter finals, he was beaten by Van Barneveld 5–1. The match is best remembered for Barneveld hitting the first 9-dart leg in the history of the PDC World Championship.

In January 2009, Klaasen was chosen as one of the two wildcards for the 2009 Premier League Darts tournament, where he competed against Taylor, James Wade, Van Barneveld, John Part, Terry Jenkins, King and the other wildcard Wayne Mardle.

Klaasen found life hard in the Premier League, losing 5 and drawing 2 of his opening 7 matches. On 26 March, Klaasen defeated Terry Jenkins 8–6 to finally record his first victory in the competition. Klaasen finished 7th in the Premier League after Wayne Mardle withdrew from the competition. Klaasen qualified for the World Matchplay in Blackpool but lost 10–8 to Ronnie Baxter in the first round.

Klaasen lost in the first round of the 2010 World Championship losing 3–1 to Welshman Barrie Bates.  He then reached the quarter finals of the 2010 World Matchplay, beating Mervyn King and Gary Anderson before losing to Simon Whitlock.

Klaasen reached the second round of the 2012 World Championship with a 3–1 win over Peter Wright, but was beaten 0–4 by James Wade in the second round. His best result of 2012 was in reaching the quarter-finals of the third UK Open Qualifier in March where he lost 4–6 to Mark Jones. At the UK Open itself he was defeated in the last 64 by Raymond van Barneveld 3–9. After revelations emerged with regard to Klaasen's personal life detailed below he did not play again in the rest of 2012, which included missing the 2013 World Championship.

2013
Klaasen returned to darts in January 2013 by qualifying for the first European Tour event of the year, the UK Darts Masters, with a 6–2 win over Carlos Rodríguez. He lost to Michael van Gerwen 5–6 in the first round. In May, Klaasen reached his first PDC final since November 2007 at the fourth Players Championship by beating the likes of Mervyn King and Gary Anderson. He averaged 103 in the final against Jamie Caven but lost 4–6 with his opponent averaging almost 111. At the UK Open he beat Gareth Pass, Ross Smith and Stuart Kellett to reach the last 16 for the first time since 2008. Klaasen played Ronnie Baxter and lost 7–9. He beat Wes Newton 6–4 and Justin Pipe 10–6 to advance to the quarter-finals of the European Championship, where he was defeated 7–10 by Michael van Gerwen. In the first round of the World Matchplay he came back from 3–8 down against Simon Whitlock to trail only 7–9, but lost the next leg to fall short of a successful fightback. Klaasen was outplayed by Gary Anderson in the first round of the World Grand Prix as the Scotsman did not give Klaasen one dart at a leg winning double in a 2–0 in sets ten minute match. In the double-start event Anderson averaged 104.86, almost 40 points ahead of Klaasen's 67.22. Klaasen knocked out number two seed Dave Chisnall 6–4 in the Players Championship Finals, before losing 9–5 to Anderson in the second round.

2014
Klaasen played Jamie Caven in the first round of the 2014 World Championship and lost 3–1 as he hit just 17% of his darts at doubles. At the German Darts Championship he reached the semi-finals of a European Tour event for the first time by defeating Michael van Gerwen 6–5 in the quarters. He played Justin Pipe and was denied a place in the final as Pipe took out a 134 finish in the deciding leg. Klaasen was narrowly beaten 9–8 by Andy Hamilton in the third round of the UK Open. At the European Championship, Klaasen knocked out reigning champion Adrian Lewis 6–4 in the first round and Caven 10–7 to reach the quarter-finals for the second year in a row, where he lost 10–5 to Mervyn King. Klaasen averaged 108.74 in beating James Wade 6–4 in the first round of the Players Championship Finals, but then averaged nearly 20 points lower as he missed 22 doubles in the next round against Dean Winstanley to be beaten 10–5.

2015
Klaasen met Gary Anderson in the second round of the 2015 World Championship after seeing off compatriot Christian Kist 3–1. Klaasen went 3–1 up and was two legs to one ahead in the next set, before Anderson took out 84 on the bull with Klaasen waiting on 89 for the match. Anderson sealed the set in the next leg and won the final two sets by three legs to one scorelines to win 4–3. Both players averaged over 100 with 20 180s thrown during the match. Klaasen defeated Phil Taylor 6–2 at the fourth UK Open Qualifier to play in his first final in almost two years. However, he missed 10 match darts to slip from 5–2 ahead of Michael van Gerwen to lose 6–5. At the UK Open, Klaasen beat Brendan Dolan 9–4, before losing 9–5 to Andrew Gilding in the fourth round. Klaasen recorded successive wins over Adrian Lewis, Mervyn King and Simon Whitlock to reach the final of the 12th Players Championship where, after taking the opening leg, he was beaten 6–1 by Peter Wright. Klaasen reached his third final of the year at the 14th Players Championship and won his first title in nearly eight years by beating Ian White 6–2. He was knocked out 10–4 by Whitlock in the first round of the World Matchplay. In September, Klaasen's second title of the year came at the 16th Players Championship with a 6–4 victory over Raymond van Barneveld.

Klaasen reached his first quarter-final at the World Grand Prix by eliminating Brendan Dolan 2–1 and Dave Chisnall 3–2 and faced Mark Webster. The match went all the way to a deciding leg in the fifth set in which Klaasen crucially missed five opening doubles and could never catch up to lose 3–2. Wins over Raymond van Barneveld and James Wade saw Klaasen reach another major quarter-final at the European Championship, but he was defeated 10–6 by Gary Anderson.

2016
Klaasen overcame Joe Cullen and Mervyn King to advance to the third round of the World Championship for the first time since 2009. He missed one dart at double 18 to complete a 147 finish and defeat Phil Taylor 4–2, before going 2–0 down in legs in the final set. Taylor missed one dart to win the match and Klaasen took full advantage by winning four legs on the trot, wrapping it up with an 11 darter. In the quarter-finals, Klaasen was 3–1 and 4–3 behind Alan Norris in a race to five. He was two legs to one down in the next set but produced back-to-back 11 dart legs to win it and then clinched the final set without conceding a leg to advance to the semi-finals of a PDC World Championship for the first time, where he faced reigning champion Gary Anderson. Klaasen's victory also marked the first time that a player has won their next game after knocking Taylor out of a PDC World Championship. In the semis he was thrashed 6–0 by Anderson, who averaged 107. Klaasen also reached the semi-finals of the next major event as he whitewashed Kyle Anderson 10–0 at the UK Open, but he lost 10–5 to Peter Wright. He was defeated 10–6 by Steve Beaton in the opening round of the World Matchplay and at the same stage of the World Grand Prix, 2–1 in sets by Adrian Lewis.

Klaasen knocked out Dave Chisnall 6–4 to reach the final of the German Darts Championship, but lost 6–5 to Norris after leading 4–2. 6–3 and 10–4 wins over Steve West and Stephen Bunting saw Klaasen face Michael van Gerwen in the quarter-finals of the European Championship and he was comfortably beaten 10–3. He missed three match darts in the third round of the Players Championship Finals as Chisnall edged through 10–9.

2017
He got to the third round of the World Championship for the second year in a row with comfortable victories over Jeffrey de Graaf and Brendan Dolan, but found himself 3–1 down to Dave Chisnall. Klaasen took the next set and led by two legs to none in the sixth, before Chisnall won three legs on the spin to triumph 4–2. His return to the Premier League was blighted by tendinitis in his wrist for which Klaasen received anti-inflammatory injections before matches. Klaasen explained how he could play for five or six legs before experiencing pain in his throwing hand. His only win out of his nine league games came against Chisnall and Klaasen finished ninth in the table to be eliminated. He lost 6–2 in the final of the German Darts Masters to Van Gerwen.

2018
At the 2018 PDC World Darts Championship, Klaasen was defeated by Jan Dekker 3–1 in the first round.
He was defeated 10–5 by  Peter Wright in the opening round of the World Matchplay.

2019

At the 2019 PDC World Darts Championship, Jelle was defeated by Keegan Brown 3–1 in the second round.
He lost in the fourth round of the UK Open to  
Madars Razma 10–4. He then qualified for his first euro tour of the year 2019 International Darts Open, losing in the first round to Joe Murnan 6–5. He then lost in the Players Championship Finals to Max Hopp 6–3.

2020
Klaasen beat Kevin Burness 3–1 in the first round of the 2020 PDC World Darts Championship, before losing to Michael van Gerwen by the same scoreline. At the 2020 UK Open, he started his campaign by defeating Riley's qualifier Jason Askew 6–4. Klaasen then beat William Borland 10–5 before thrashing Steve West 10–1 to set up a sixth-round clash with Gary Anderson. He overcame Anderson 10–9 before losing in the quarter-finals to Daryl Gurney.

WDF Career
From the beginning of 2022, Klaasen took part in tournaments organized by the World Darts Federation. In June 2022, he took part in the Dutch Open, where he was seeded in 26th. On his way to the final of this tournament, he defeated leading WDF players including Richard Veenstra and Thibault Tricole, before defeating Mark Barilli in the final. This qualified him for the 2023 WDF World Darts Championship and 2022 Winmau World Masters. In November, he won the Irish Open. On his way to the final, he defeated Michael Warburton, Kai Fan Leung and Ryan Hogarth. In the final, he faced Dylan Slevin and defeated him by 6–3 in legs. Since November 2022, he has been the leader of the World Darts Federation men's ranking.

Personal life
Klaasen lives in Goor, Netherlands. He has Indonesian origins.

Before the 2006 World Championships, Klaasen worked for a manpower agency in the Netherlands but he has now taken up darts full-time. He is sponsored by Keukenconcurrent, a company that produces fitted kitchens in his home country.

Controversy in 2012
In August 2012, Klaasen was accused of sending naked photo messages to a then 15-year-old family friend of his compatriot – fellow darts player and former friend since childhood – Michael van Gerwen, which he has admitted to in the Dutch press.

According to her mother, the underaged girl was diagnosed with PDD-NOS, an autism spectrum disorder. Though during the prosecution service process (the case didn't go to court) this was never proven.

Later that year, on 13 December, he was sentenced to 16 hours of community service and a fine of €327, to be paid to the girl.

World Championship results

BDO/WDF
 2006: Winner (beat Raymond van Barneveld 7–5)
 2007: First round (lost to Co Stompé 0–3)
 2023:

PDC
 2008: First round (lost to Vincent van der Voort 2–3)
 2009: Quarter-finals (lost to Raymond van Barneveld 1–5)
 2010: First round (lost to Barrie Bates 1–3)
 2011: First round (lost to Steve Brown 1–3)
 2012: Second round (lost to James Wade 0–4)
 2014: First round (lost to Jamie Caven 1–3)
 2015: Second round (lost to Gary Anderson 3–4)
 2016: Semi-finals (lost to Gary Anderson 0–6)
 2017: Third round (lost to Dave Chisnall 2–4)
 2018: First round (lost to Jan Dekker 1–3)
 2019: Second round (lost to Keegan Brown 1–3)
 2020: Second round (lost to Michael van Gerwen 1–3)

Career finals

BDO major finals: 1 (1 title)

Note

Performance timeline

BDO

See also
 List of darts players who have switched organisation

References

External links
Jelle Klaasen's management website

Lakeside tournament brochure 2006
"Klaasen springs world title shock" BBC SPort

1984 births
Living people
Dutch darts players
BDO world darts champions
Dutch people of Indonesian descent
Indo people
People from Alphen-Chaam
Professional Darts Corporation former tour card holders
British Darts Organisation players
PDC ranking title winners
Sportspeople from North Brabant